Cullen James Rogers (May 29, 1921 – November 1, 1997) was an American football halfback who played one season with the Pittsburgh Steelers of the National Football League. He was drafted by the Cleveland Rams in the 16th round of the 1943 NFL Draft. He played college football and baseball at Texas A&M University. Rogers attended Mart High School in Mart, Texas.

References

External links
Just Sports Stats

1921 births
1997 deaths
Players of American football from Texas
American football halfbacks
Texas A&M Aggies baseball players
Texas A&M Aggies football players
Pittsburgh Steelers players
People from Mart, Texas